Eckerd may refer to:

Eckerd Corporation (Eckerd Pharmacy), former American drugstore chain
Eckerd College, private liberal arts college in St. Petersburg, Florida, United States
Eckerd College Search and Rescue, a student volunteer maritime search and rescue team
Eckerd Tritons, an intercollegiate sports team representing Eckerd College
Eckerd Open, defunct WTA Tour affiliated women's tennis tournament
Ruth Eckerd Hall, a performing arts venue in Clearwater, Florida

People 
Jack Eckerd (1913–2004), American businessman